The 1949 New York Bulldogs season was their first season in New York in the National Football League (NFL), and the continuation of the Dayton Triangles franchise, after having played the previous five years as the Boston Yanks, and last as the Bulldogs (subsequently becoming the New York Yanks). They finished 1–10–1, last place in the Eastern Division and the worst record in the ten-team league.

The head coach was Charley Ewart, previously the general manager (and backfield coach) for the Philadelphia Eagles who played college football at Yale. Signed to a three-year contract, he resigned the day after the regular season's final game, a 27–0 home loss to Pittsburgh with just over 4,000 in attendance.

NFL Draft

Source:

Halfback Doak Walker was selected as a "future pick" after his Heisman Trophy-winning junior season, but he stayed at SMU for his senior season in 1949. (He missed the 1946 season due to military service.) Walker's draft rights were traded to the Detroit Lions, where his hall of fame career began in 1950.

Schedule

Standings

References

1949
New York Bulldogs
1949 in sports in New York City